Solido Design Automation Inc. is an electronic design automation (EDA) software company, headquartered in Saskatoon, Saskatchewan. The company develops software for analog/mixed-signal and custom integrated circuits. The company was founded in 2005 and is funded by BDC Venture Capital, Victoria Park Capital, and Golden Opportunities Fund.

Solido Variation Designer is variation-aware custom integrated circuit design software. It uses foundry models to address variation caused by process and environmental (PVT) corners, global and local random variation, and proximity effects. Solido ML Characterization Suite is a software that uses machine learning to generate library timing models.

Solido was acquired by Mentor, a Siemens business on December 1, 2017. Solido had been growing its revenue by 50 and 70 percent each year from 2009 to 2017, and was ranked in the top 500 fastest growing technology companies in North America by Deloitte in 2017.

Management team 
Amit Gupta, president and chief executive officer
Jeff Dyck, vice president of technical operations
Kristopher Breen, vice president of customer applications

See also 
Electronic design automation
Integrated circuit design

References 

EE Times (February 2, 2009):'Solido named to EE Times list of top 60 emerging startups'
EDN (February 1, 2008):'Solido named finalist for EDN Innovation Award'
EDN (December 14, 2007):'Solido named EDN Hot 100 Products of 2007'
IC Design and Verification Journal (March 17, 2009):'Showing your true corners'
Electronicstalk (January 28, 2009):'System solves process variation design problems'
EDN (February 17, 2009):'Solido design attacks variations in transistor-level analog design'
EE Times (February 3, 2009):'Process variation tool targets analog/mixed-signal design loss'
EETimes (January 23, 2009):'Solido launches process variation solution'
SCD Source (September 2, 2008):'Improving statistical design for analog/custom circuits'

External links
Solido Design Automation homepage

Electronic design automation companies
Software companies based in California
Technology companies based in the San Francisco Bay Area
Companies based in San Jose, California
Software companies established in 2005
2005 establishments in California
Defunct software companies of the United States